Sparksee (formerly known as DEX) is a high-performance and scalable graph database management system written in C++. From version 6.0, Sparksee has shifted its focus to embedded systems and mobile, becoming the first graph database specialized in mobile platforms with versions for IOS and Android.

Its development started in 2006 and its first version was available on  Q3 - 2008. The sixth version is available since Q2-2021. There is a free community version, for academic or evaluation purposes, available to download, limited to 1 million nodes, no limit on edges.

Sparksee is a product originated by the research carried out at DAMA-UPC (Data Management group at the Polytechnic University of Catalonia). In March 2010 a spin-off called Sparsity-Technologies has been created at the UPC to commercialize and give services to the technologies developed at DAMA-UPC.

DEX changed name to Sparksee on its 5th release in February 2014.

Graph Model 
Sparksee is based on a graph database model, that is basically characterized by three properties: data structures are graphs or any other structure similar to a graph; data manipulation and queries are based on graph-oriented operations; and there are data constraints to guarantee the integrity of the data and its relationships.

A Sparksee graph is a Labeled Directed Attributed Multigraph. Labeled because nodes and edges in a graph belong to types. Directed because it supports directed edges as well as undirected. Attributed because both nodes and edges may have attributes and Multigraph meaning that there may be multiple edges between the same nodes even if they are from the same edge type.

One of its main characteristics is its performance storage and retrieval for  large graphs (in the order of billions of nodes, edges and attributes) implemented with specialized structures.

Technical Details
 Programming Language: C++
 API: Java, .NET, C++, Python2/3, Objective-C
 OS Compatibility: Windows, Linux, Mac OS, iOS, BB10
 Persistency: Disk
 Transactions: full ACID
 Recovery Manager
 Encryption
 Open Cypher Query Language

See also
 Graph Database
 NoSQL

References

Also
 D. Domínguez-Sal, P. Urbón-Bayes, A.Giménez-Vañó, S. Gómez-Villamor, N.Martínez-Bazán, J.L. Larriba-Pey. Survey of Graph Database Performance on the HPC Scalable Graph Analysis Benchmark. International Workshop on Graph Databases. July 2010.

External links
 Sparksee homepage at Sparsity-Technologies

Graph databases